Cinzano is an Italian brand of vermouth.

Cinzano may also refer to:

 Cinzano Milano, an LBA Italian professional basketball team, based in Milan, Italy
 Cinzano, Piedmont, town in Italy
 Cinzano Crystal Palace, a basketball team competing in the National Basketball League and then the British Basketball League

See also 

 Marone Cinzano